Daniel Mark Hardy (born 17 May 1982) is an English former mixed martial artist who fought in the welterweight division. During his professional MMA career, which began in 2004, Hardy fought in multiple promotions, such as Cage Force and Cage Warriors, before signing a contract with the Ultimate Fighting Championship (UFC) in 2008. In 2010, he fought Georges St-Pierre for the UFC Welterweight Championship, but lost the bout via decision.

Biography
Hardy was born in Nottingham, England, where he began martial arts training at the age of 5. Hardy's initial education was in Taekwondo, and he later began competing at the age of 7. He started practising other martial arts as a teenager, which included Karate, Jujutsu, Judo and eventually wushu. After he had finished college, he began Muay Thai and Boxing at the age of 19. He then moved to Mixed martial arts a year later. His nickname, "The Outlaw", comes from the screen name he used online when he was looking for training partners after a disagreement with a coach which led to his former training partners being forbidden to work with him.

Ultimate Fighting Championship

Hardy defeated Akihiro Gono via split decision in his UFC debut at UFC 89. Gono was left swollen and bloody by several of Hardy's left hooks. Gono rocked Hardy on several occasions. In the third round, Gono pushed Hardy to the canvas and while there, landed an illegal knee to the head of the downed fighter causing the fight to be stopped for a lengthy period and a point deduction for Gono. Hardy recovered and went on to win the split decision (29–28, 28–29, and 29–28).

Hardy knocked out Rory Markham at 1:09 of the first round with a clean counter left hook on 21 February 2009 at UFC 95. In his post-fight interview, Hardy retorted to Markham's pre-fight accusation that he had weak hands by exclaiming to the ecstatic crowd, "No punching power? What do you have to say about that?"

Hardy next faced Marcus Davis at UFC 99 on 13 June 2009. The grudge between the two began with the Irish-American Davis fighting in the UK against local fighters and defeating them all. Hardy stated that the UK was his home and he did not want Davis in it, building a fan base. It started to get personal when Hardy began openly insulting Davis, calling him a 'fake Irishman' and stating that Davis's website "looked like a St. Patrick's day gift shop blew up." Afterwards, on a UK underground MMA website, Hardy encouraged fans to post photoshopped pictures of Davis in a homosexual fashion. The pictures upset Davis, causing him to confront Hardy at a UFC 99 press conference. The two continued to argue, but finally agreed to settle it in the cage. After a three-round war, the judges awarded Hardy a razor-thin split decision victory. Davis stormed out of the cage, ignoring Hardy's attempts to make peace. Davis later told reporters that he wanted a rematch with Hardy in Ireland or Boston, as well as stating how controversial he thought the decision was. Hardy insisted in his post-fight interview with Davis (and after the event to fans) that all of the controversy was an effort to get Davis off his game-plan and that it was nothing personal.

On 14 November 2009 at UFC 105, he faced Mike Swick, who replaced an injured Dong Hyun Kim. At a press conference in Manchester Hardy was the underdog coming into the fight, but managed to rock Swick early in the first round with a straight right hand, which appeared to dent the American's confidence. Hardy won the fight via unanimous decision (30–27, 30–27, and 29–28) and booked his place as the #1 contender for the UFC Welterweight Championship. In being awarded the title shot, Hardy became the first English fighter in UFC history to receive one. UFC President Dana White confirmed at the post-fight press conference that the fight would most likely be held in Las Vegas. Hardy stated in a post-fight interview with Sherdog.com that the next event in Las Vegas (UFC 109) in February was too early for him and he would rather wait.

Title shot
Hardy fought Georges St-Pierre for the welterweight title on 27 March 2010 at UFC 111 in Newark, New Jersey. During the bout, St-Pierre was able to take Hardy down at will, controlling him with effective ground and pound. St. Pierre also attempted a kimura in the first and fourth rounds, but Hardy escaped. St-Pierre won the bout via unanimous decision. After the fight, St-Pierre stated his surprise that Hardy refused to tap. In the post-fight interview with Joe Rogan, Hardy stated "....tap?...I don't know the meaning of tap."

Post-title fight
Hardy faced Carlos Condit on 16 October 2010 at UFC 120 in his home country. During an exchange late in the first round, both Hardy and Condit threw left hooks at the same time: Hardy's punch staggered Condit, although Condit's punch dropped Hardy. Condit followed up with two more punches on the ground, causing the referee to stop the fight at 4:27 of the first round, giving Hardy his first KO loss.

Hardy faced Anthony Johnson on 26 March 2011 at UFC Fight Night 24. Going into the fight, both fighters expressed a desire to stand up and trade with one another, however Johnson contradicted what he had said before the fight, and mostly utilised his wrestling to grind out a unanimous decision victory for all three rounds.

Hardy faced Chris Lytle on 14 August 2011 at UFC on Versus 5. Hardy stated that he had changed his training going into the fight, moving to Las Vegas to train at the Country Club with Roy Nelson to work on his grappling, particularly his wrestling defence/offence. He lost the fight via guillotine choke late in the third round. The bout was awarded Fight of the Night honours. Despite losing four fights in a row, Lorenzo Fertitta quoted he would not cut Hardy from the UFC, stating: "I ain't cutting Dan Hardy. I love guys that war!".

Hardy faced Duane Ludwig on 26 May 2012 at UFC 146. Hardy defeated Ludwig via first-round KO with a perfectly timed left hook, earning him his first victory since 2009.

He defeated Amir Sadollah via unanimous decision (29–28, 29–28, and 30–27) at UFC on Fuel TV 5 on 29 September 2012.

Hardy was expected to face Matt Brown on 20 April 2013 at UFC on Fox 7.  However, Hardy was diagnosed with Wolff–Parkinson–White pattern  and replaced by Jordan Mein.

Medical condition
In 2013, Hardy was diagnosed with Wolff–Parkinson–White syndrome. A treatment for Wolff–Parkinson–White syndrome is ablation, cauterising of heart tissue to fix the electrical pathway issue, however Hardy has refused to have this treatment on the basis that the condition has never actually given him any problems. Eventually in October 2018 Hardy said in an interview that he has been medically cleared and eligible to return to fighting.

During his hiatus, Hardy has served as a commentator for UFC's Fight Pass events, and works as an analyst on Fox Sports. In August 2017, Hardy joined Sky Sports as an analyst for Floyd Mayweather vs. Conor McGregor. On 15 August 2019 Hardy appeared as a guest on The Joe Rogan Experience, revealing he is joining USADA testing pool in order to be eligible for competition.

While on commentator duties for the second Polaris Squads event, Hardy revealed that he was planning to make his return to professional MMA for one final fight in the UFC at some point in 2021.

UFC commentator 
While working as a commentator at UFC on ESPN: Whittaker vs. Till on 26 July 2020, Dan Hardy was involved in a verbal confrontation with referee Herb Dean after Hardy took offence to what he believed to be a late stoppage by Dean in a bout between Francisco Trinaldo and Jai Herbert. UFC president Dana White indicated afterwards that he would not take action against Hardy but that he would not tolerate any confrontations of officials in future.

In March 2021, news surfaced that Hardy was released from UFC after he had been involved in another argument with a female UFC employee. Hardy disputed that he was terminated, however, and stated "I am no longer working directly with the UFC, ‘female’ part is irrelevant. It was a disagreement over an opportunity missed, or withheld, and I’d love some answers but can’t get any."

In May 2021, Hardy announced that he was released from his UFC fight contract.

Personal life
Hardy is a fan of punk, metal and hardcore music. His favourite hardcore bands include Earth Crisis, Madball, and Blood for Blood. His opening song is "England Belongs To Me" by the British Oi! band Cock Sparrer, and he and the band have recorded a version of the song together. He has a passion for art, rarely spending a day without a sketch pad in his bag until the age of 22. He gave up his degree in art and design in his final year at Nottingham Trent University to pursue MMA full-time. 
Hardy lives in England. In recent years, he has also become an outspoken critic of trophy hunting on numerous occasions, even calling Matt Hughes "bad for the sport" due to his trophy-hunting in the States and abroad. Hardy is an agnostic.
In 2015, Hardy was part of the Great Britain team for the first leg of the Clipper Round the World Yacht Race.

Hardy married UFC fighter Veronica Macedo on December 25, 2022.

Championships and achievements 

Ultimate Fighting Championship
Knockout of the Night (One time)
Fight Of The Night (One time)
Cage Warriors Fighting Championship
Cage Warriors Light Welterweight Champion (One time)
Cage Warriors Welterweight Championship (One time)
CombatPress.com
2019 Broadcast Analyst of the Year

Mixed martial arts record 

|-
| Win
| align=center| 25–10 (1)
| Amir Sadollah
| Decision (unanimous)
| UFC on Fuel TV: Struve vs. Miocic
| 
| align=center| 3
| align=center| 5:00
| Nottingham, England
| 
|-
| Win
| align=center| 24–10 (1)
| Duane Ludwig
| KO (punch and elbows)
| UFC 146
| 
| align=center| 1
| align=center| 3:51
| Las Vegas, Nevada, United States
| 
|-
| Loss
| align=center| 23–10 (1)
| Chris Lytle
| Submission (guillotine choke)
| UFC Live: Hardy vs. Lytle
| 
| align=center| 3
| align=center| 4:16
| Milwaukee, Wisconsin, United States
| 
|-
| Loss
| align=center| 23–9 (1)
| Anthony Johnson
| Decision (unanimous)
| UFC Fight Night: Nogueira vs. Davis
| 
| align=center| 3
| align=center| 5:00
| Seattle, Washington, United States
| 
|-
| Loss
| align=center| 23–8 (1)
| Carlos Condit
| KO (punch)
| UFC 120
| 
| align=center| 1
| align=center| 4:27
| London, England
| 
|-
| Loss

| align=center| 23–7 (1)
| Georges St-Pierre
| Decision (unanimous)
| UFC 111
| 
| align=center| 5
| align=center| 5:00
| Newark, New Jersey, United States
| 
|-
| Win
| align=center| 23–6 (1)
| Mike Swick
| Decision (unanimous)
| UFC 105
| 
| align=center| 3
| align=center| 5:00
| Manchester, England
| 
|-
| Win
| align=center| 22–6 (1)
| Marcus Davis
| Decision (split)
| UFC 99
| 
| align=center| 3
| align=center| 5:00
| Cologne, Germany
| 
|-
| Win
| align=center| 21–6 (1)
| Rory Markham
| KO (punch)
| UFC 95
| 
| align=center| 1
| align=center| 1:09
| London, England
| 
|-
| Win
| align=center| 20–6 (1)
| Akihiro Gono
| Decision (split)
| UFC 89
| 
| align=center| 3
| align=center| 5:00
| Birmingham, England
| 
|-
| Win
| align=center| 19–6 (1)
| Daniel Weichel
| TKO (elbows)
| Ultimate Force: Punishment
| 
| align=center| 2
| align=center| 1:49
| Doncaster, England
| 
|-
| Win
| align=center| 18–6 (1)
| Chad Reiner
| TKO (punches)
| CWFC: Enter the Rough House 6
| 
| align=center| 3
| align=center| 2:10
| Nottingham, England
| 
|-
| Win
| align=center| 17–6 (1)
| Manuel Garcia
| Submission (punches)
| CWFC: Enter The Rough House 5
| 
| align=center| 1
| align=center| 2:21
| Nottingham, England
| 
|-
| Loss
| align=center| 16–6 (1)
| Yoshiyuki Yoshida
| DQ (accidental groin kick)
| GCM: Cage Force 5
| 
| align=center| 2
| align=center| 0:04
| Tokyo, Japan
| 
|-
| Win
| align=center| 16–5 (1)
| Hidetaka Monma
| TKO (corner stoppage)
| GCM: Cage Force 4
| 
| align=center| 3
| align=center| 0:29
| Tokyo, Japan
| 
|-
| Win
| align=center| 15–5 (1)
| Daizo Ishige
| Decision (unanimous)
| GCM: Cage Force EX Eastern Bound 
| 
| align=center| 3
| align=center| 5:00
| Tokyo, Japan
| 
|-
| Win
| align=center| 14–5 (1)
| Willy Ni
| Submission (guillotine choke)
| CWFC: Enter The Rough House 2
| 
| align=center| 2
| align=center| 0:39
| Nottingham, England
| 
|-
| Win
| align=center| 13–5 (1)
| Alexandre Izidro
| TKO (punches)
| CWFC: Enter The Rough House
| 
| align=center| 3
| align=center| 4:56
| Nottingham, England
| 
|-
| Win
| align=center| 12–5 (1)
| Danny Rushton
| TKO (retirement)
| CWFC: Showdown
| 
| align=center| 1
| align=center| 5:00
| Sheffield, England
| 
|-
| Loss
| align=center| 11–5 (1)
| David Baron
| Decision (unanimous) 
| 2 Hot 2 Handle: Road to Japan
| 
| align=center| 2
| align=center| 3:00
| Amsterdam, Netherlands
| 
|-
| Loss
| align=center| 11–4 (1)
| Forrest Petz
| Decision (unanimous)
| Fightfest 2
| 
| align=center| 3
| align=center| 5:00
| Canton, Ohio, United States
| 
|-
| Win
| align=center| 11–3 (1)
| Diego Gonzalez
| TKO (doctor stoppage)
| CWFC: Strike Force 5
| 
| align=center| 3
| align=center| 0:19
| Coventry, England
| 
|-
| Win
| align=center| 10–3 (1)
| Matt Thorpe
| Decision (split)
| CWFC: Strike Force 4
| 
| align=center| 5
| align=center| 5:00
| Coventry, England
| 
|-
| NC
| align=center| 9–3 (1)
| Diego Gonzalez
| NC (overturned) 
| CWFC: Strike Force 3
| 
| align=center| 2
| align=center| 1:19
| Coventry, England
| 
|-
| Win
| align=center| 9–3
| Sami Berik
| Decision (unanimous)
| CWFC: Quest 3
| 
| align=center| 3
| align=center| 5:00
| Sheffield, England
| 
|-
| Win
| align=center| 8–3
| Lautaro Arborelo
| TKO (punches)
| CWFC: Strike Force 2
| 
| align=center| 3
| align=center| 3:52
| Coventry, England
| 
|-
| Win
| align=center| 7–3
| Alexandre Izidro
| Decision (unanimous)
| KOTC: Warzone
| 
| align=center| 2
| align=center| 5:00
| Sheffield, England
| 
|-
| Win
| align=center| 6–3
| Stuart Barrs
| TKO (punches)
| UK Storm 2
| 
| align=center| 2
| align=center| 2:44
| Birmingham, England
| 
|-
| Loss
| align=center| 5–3
| David Baron
| Submission (triangle choke)
| CWFC: Strike Force
| 
| align=center| 2
| align=center| 3:10
| Coventry, England
| 
|-
| Win
| align=center| 5–2
| Andy Walker
| TKO (punches)
| CWFC: Quest 1
| 
| align=center| 1
| align=center| 3:26
| Yorkshire, England
| 
|-
| Win
| align=center| 4–2
| Lee Doski
| Submission (injury)
| Fight Club UK 1
| 
| align=center| 2
| align=center| N/A
| Sheffield, England
| 
|-
| Win
| align=center| 3–2
| Aaron Barrow
| KO (head kick and punches)
| CWFC 9: Xtreme Xmas
| 
| align=center| 1
| align=center| 0:13
| Sheffield, England
| 
|-
| Loss
| align=center| 2–2
| Pat Healy
| Submission (guillotine choke)
| Absolute Fighting Championships 10
| 
| align=center| 1
| align=center| 3:50
| Fort Lauderdale, Florida, United States
| 
|-
| Win
| align=center| 2–1
| Andy Melia
| Submission (punches)
| CWFC 8: Brutal Force	
| 
| align=center| 2
| align=center| 3:55
| Sheffield, England
| 
|-
| Win
| align=center| 1–1
| Paul Jenkins
| Decision (majority)
| Full Contact Fight Night 2
| 
| align=center| 3
| align=center| 5:00
| Portsmouth, England
| 
|-
| Loss
| align=center| 0–1
| Lee Doski
| Submission (rear-naked choke)
| Extreme Brawl 7
| 
| align=center| 2
| align=center| 4:59
| Bracknell, England
|

See also

 List of male mixed martial artists

References and footnotes

External links
 
 

1982 births
Living people
English male mixed martial artists
Welterweight mixed martial artists
English practitioners of Brazilian jiu-jitsu
English Muay Thai practitioners
English male taekwondo practitioners
British wushu practitioners
Mixed martial artists utilizing taekwondo
Mixed martial artists utilizing wushu
Mixed martial artists utilizing boxing
Mixed martial artists utilizing Muay Thai
Mixed martial artists utilizing Brazilian jiu-jitsu
Sportspeople from Nottingham
People educated at West Bridgford School
English agnostics
English male boxers
Ultimate Fighting Championship male fighters